Can of worms is an idiom referring to a slew of subsequent problems and dilemmas arising from a decision or action. The phrase may also refer to:

Transportation
 Can of Worms (interchange) in Rochester, New York
 Can of Worms (Minnesota interchange) in Duluth, Minnesota

Media
 Can of Worms (film), a 1999 Disney Channel Original Movie
 Can of Worms (TV program), an Australian television talk show
 "Can of Worms", an episode of the animated television series Ninjago: Masters of Spinjitzu
 "Can of Worms" (Red Dwarf), an episode of Red Dwarf

Books
 Can of Worms, a 1986 book by Evan Whitton
 Can of Worms, a novel by Kathy Mackel
 A Can of Worms, a 1987 novel by Russell H. Greenan
 "A Can of Worms", an essay by David Sedaris included in his 2004 collection Dress Your Family in Corduroy and Denim

Music
 Can of Worms (band), a French death/Thrash Metal band
 "Can of Worms", a song by Buck 65 from Man Overboard

See also 
 Pandora's box
 Malfunction Junction (disambiguation)
 Spaghetti junction